The 2012 Danish Individual Speedway Championship was the 2012 edition of the Danish Individual Speedway Championship. The final was staged over two rounds, at Holsted and Outrup, and was won by Niels Kristian Iversen. It was the first time Iversen had won the national title.

Event format 
The competition started with two semi finals, with five progressing to the final series from each. The final series was held over two rounds, with the top four scorers from the two rounds then competing in a Grand Final. The points from the Grand Final were then added to the total score and the overall winner was the rider with the most total points.

Semi finals

Final series

Final classification

References 

Denmark